Jakob Balzert (6 January 1918 – 23 June 1997) was a German footballer who played for 1. FC Saarbrücken and the Saarland national team as a forward.

References

1918 births
1997 deaths
German footballers
Saar footballers
Saarland international footballers
1. FC Saarbrücken players
Association football forwards